Kuusiokunnat  is a subdivision of Southern Ostrobothnia and one of the Sub-regions of Finland since 2009. 

The name means "six municipalities", which refers to how many municipalities there were in the sub-region when it was established. Nowadays it only contains three municipalities.

Municipalities
 Alavus
 Kuortane
 Ähtäri

Former
 Lehtimäki (now part of Alajärvi, in the Järviseutu sub-region)
 Soini (switched to Järviseutu sub-region)
 Töysä (joined Alavus in 2013)

Politics
Results of the 2018 Finnish presidential election:

 Sauli Niinistö   59.9%
 Paavo Väyrynen   11.0%
 Matti Vanhanen   10.9%
 Laura Huhtasaari   9.9%
 Pekka Haavisto   4.0%
 Tuula Haatainen   2.7%
 Merja Kyllönen   1.4%
 Nils Torvalds   0.2%

Sub-regions of Finland
Geography of South Ostrobothnia